Termitaradus  is a small tropicopolitan genus of true bugs placed in the family Termitaphididae. The same is true for the extinct species with the exception of T. protera which reaches  in length. All members of Termitaphididae are inquilines lodging in the nests of host species of termites, with Termitaradus  species known only from the family Rhinotermitidae. Though considered a separate family in Aradoidea it has been suggested by Drs David Grimaldi and Michael Engel in 2008 that Termataphididae may in fact be highly derived members of Aradidae. The second genus placed in Termitaphididae, Termitaphis, contains the monotypic species Termitaphis circumvallata which inhabits nests of Termitidae (termites) in Colombia.

Species
The eight living species are found worldwide in the tropical regions of Central and South America, Africa, Asia, and Australia while three extinct species are known from  Miocene Dominican amber and the third from Late Oligocene to Early Miocene Mexican amber. 
T. annandalei
T. australiensis
†T. avitinquilinus (Dominican Amber)
†T. dominicanus (Dominican amber)
T. guianae
T. jamaicensis
T. mexicana
†T. mitnicki (Dominican amber)
T. panamensis
†T. protera (Mexican amber)
T. subafra
T. trinidadensis

References

Aradoidea